Benthosema glaciale, or glacier lantern fish, is the most common species of lanternfish and important part of the midwater ecosystem of northern North Atlantic.

It feeds on small crustaceans, including copepods, krill and amphipods, along with other small invertebrates.

Distribution
Benthosema glaciale occurs in the North Atlantic as well as in the Mediterranean Sea. In the eastern Atlantic it is found from Guinea northwards to the Kara Sea, and in the western Atlantic from the northern edge of the Gulf Stream northwards to the Baffin Bay and Greenland. It is common in Norwegian fjords.

It undergoes diel vertical migration, moving to shallower water to feed at night. However, depth distribution can be bimodal at night, suggesting that not all individuals migrate.

Life history
Benthosema glaciale can grow to  SL. They have a maximum lifespan of about eight years, although typical lifespan is shorter. Maturity is reached at age 2–3 years. Spawning takes place mostly in summer. In Norway, oceanic populations grow slower but to a larger size than fjord populations. Mediterranean populations have smaller body size, shorter lifespan, and might spawn throughout the year.

References

glacier lantern fish
Fish of the North Atlantic
Fish of the Mediterranean Sea
glacier lantern fish
Taxa named by Johan Reinhardt